The Eurovision Song Contest 1992 was the 37th edition of the annual Eurovision Song Contest. Organised by the European Broadcasting Union (EBU) and host broadcaster  (SVT), the contest was held at the Malmö Isstadion on 9 May 1992 and was hosted by Swedish journalists Lydia Capolicchio and Harald Treutiger.

Twenty-three countries took part in the contest with the  returning after being absent the year before. This set another record for the most participating countries in the history of the competition, which would be broken again the following year. The 1992 contest also saw the last participation of the Federal Republic of Yugoslavia, as they were banned from competing only a few weeks later due to the Yugoslav Wars.

The song was written by Johnny Logan, who had won the  contest as singer and the  contest as singer/songwriter. At 41 years of age, Linda Martin became (and remains) the oldest woman ever to win Eurovision.

Location

Malmö is the capital and largest city of the Swedish county of Scania. The metropolis is a gamma world city (as listed by the GaWC) and is the third-largest city in Sweden, after Stockholm and Gothenburg, and the sixth-largest city in Scandinavia, with a population of above 300,000.

Malmö Isstadion, an indoor ice hockey arena, was chosen to host Eurovision.

Contest overview
The contest took place at the Malmö Isstadion, where the stage set was in the shape of a Viking ship's bow with a dragon in the centre and stars on each side. The opening sequence included women dressed in the Swedish colours of yellow and blue, twirling ribbons. The filmic postcard tradition was continued with clips based on each country. Last year's winner, Carola, appeared on stage in a white dress with sheer sleeves, a rhinestone collar and cuffs and sang “All The Reasons To Live”.

The 1992 Eurovision was the biggest contest at that time, with 23 countries competing. Only Monaco and Morocco failed to compete out of all the countries which had entered the contest in the past.

This contest marked the last participation of Yugoslavia, although it was not the same country that had participated from 1961 to 1991, but actually, Serbia and Montenegro, formally known as the "Federal Republic of Yugoslavia". That was the country's last entry until 2004, as it was banned from the contest following the sanctions on the United Nations Security Council Resolution 757, following the Bosnian War and Croatian War of Independence.

After scoring second place consecutively (1988, 1989) and scoring some disappointing results (1990, 1991), the United Kingdom sent Michael Ball with a contemporary pop song "One Step Out Of Time", which was the hot favourite to win the contest. The British delegation was greeted in Malmö with a banner reading "Welcome Untied Kingdom".

However, the Irish sent Linda Martin, who had the past experience of coming in 2nd place in the 1984 contest and as then paired up once again with Johnny Logan, who had won the contest twice before as a performer. In the end, Linda the contest won for Ireland with a 16-point lead over the United Kingdom, starting the chain of Irish wins in the 1990s. Malta with "Little Child", performed by Mary Spiteri, also scored very well coming in 3rd place with 123 points. This was the first time that the three highest-placed songs had all been in English. Sweden, the host country, finished 2nd last.

Switzerland had to replace its original choice of entry, "Soleil, soleil" which was to have been performed by Géraldine Olivier. The song did not comply with some of the rules of the national selection contest and so, despite having won, it did not go to Malmö.

The top three songs were all performed in English which led to some delegations complaining that English-speaking countries had an unfair advantage.

Participating countries

Conductors
Each performance had a conductor who led the orchestra. Musical Director Anders Berglund both conducted the entries for Sweden and Yugoslavia and played the accordion parts for the latter.

 Javier Losada
 Frank Fievez
 Kobi Oshrat
 Aydın Özarı
 Haris Andreadis
 Magdi Vasco Noverraz
 Anders Berglund
 
 George Theofanous
 Paul Abela
 Nigel Wright
 Olli Ahvenlahti
 
 Christian Jacob
 Leon Ives
 Ronnie Hazlehurst
 Noel Kelehan
 
 
  YugoslaviaAnders Berglund
 Rolf Løvland
 Norbert Daum
 Harry van Hoof

Returning artists

Participants and results

Detailed voting results 

Each country had a jury who awarded 12, 10, 8, 7, 6, 5, 4, 3, 2, 1 point(s) for their top ten songs.

12 points
Below is a summary of all 12 points in the final:

Spokespersons 

Each country announced their votes in the order of performance. The following is a list of spokespersons who announced the votes for their respective country.

 María Ángeles Balañac
 Jacques Olivier
 Daniel Pe'er
 Fotini Giannoulatou
 Olivier Minne
 
 Ana Zanatti
 Anna Partelidou
 Joanna Drake
 Guðrún Skúladóttir
 Solveig Herlin
 Michel Stocker
 TBC
 Andy Lee
 Colin Berry
 Eileen Dunne
 
 Nicoletta Orsomando
  YugoslaviaVeselin Mrđen
 
 Carmen Nebel
 Herman Slager

Broadcasts 

Each participating broadcaster was required to relay the contest via its networks. Non-participating broadcasters were also able to relay the contest as "passive participants". Broadcasters were able to send commentators to provide coverage of the contest in their own native language and to relay information about the artists and songs to their television viewers. The contest was broadcast in 34 countries, including Australia, New Zealand and South Korea. Known details on the broadcasts in each country, including the specific broadcasting stations and commentators are shown in the tables below.

Notes

References

External links

 
1992
Music festivals in Sweden
1992 in music
1992 in Sweden
Events in Malmö
May 1992 events in Europe
1990s in Malmö